Women for Sale (Hebrew: Nashim Limechira) is a 2005 documentary film  by Israeli journalist, film director and producer Nili Tal.  It explores the phenomenon of Russian women who immigrate to Israel to work as prostitutes. The film was commissioned by Channel 8, Israel.

Synopsis
In the post-Perestroika era in Russia, many young women were driven to work abroad by the hardships they were suffering in their own country. Israel is one of the countries they immigrate to and work as prostitutes. Some are trafficked, some end up in prison or deported.

Women for Sale examines the lives of these women in a sympathetic, compassionate and non-judgemental manner. The film features interviews with the women, and follows the police, including during a brothel raid. The film also examines the role of religion in the women's lives.

Festivals
Women for Sale was screened at the following film festivals:

 2005: Docaviv International Documentary Film Festival (Feb 24, 2005)
 2005: TJFF – Toronto Jewish Film Festival 
 2005: International Women's film Festival in Israel
 2006: 4th Annual Austin Jewish Film Festival (Jan 2006)

References

External links

Documentary films about prostitution
Israeli documentary films
Documentary films about Jews and Judaism
2000s Russian-language films
Films about prostitution in Israel
2005 films
2005 documentary films